North Korea Uncovered is a comprehensive set of mappings of North Korea. It includes in-depth coverage of thousands of buildings, monuments, missile-storage facilities, mass graves, secret labor camps, palaces, restaurants, tourist sites, and main roads of the country, and even includes the entrance to the country's subterranean nuclear test base, the Yongbyon Nuclear Scientific Research Center.

The mapping was the result of a two-year effort by doctoral student Curtis Melvin and other volunteers, who pored over hundreds of news reports, images, accounts, books, and maps in order to identify the geographic and political sites. The result has been called one of the most detailed maps of North Korea available to the public in 2009. It is available as a small KMZ file, viewable with Google Earth. Between April 2007 and April 2012, the data file was downloaded more than 270,000 times.

See also
 North Korean leader's residences
 Sinuiju North Korean Leader's Residence

References

External links 
 North Korea Uncovered, (North Korea Google Earth), a comprehensive mapping of North Korea on Google Earth
 #AccessDPRK is a similar Google Earth project which was completed in 2017 and contains over 53,000 placemarks

Geography of North Korea
North Korean studies